Park Hyun-wook (born 1967) is a South Korean writer.

Life 
Park Hyun-wook was born in Seoul, South Korea in 1967. He studied sociology at Yonsei University. He made his literary debut in 2001 when his novel Dongjeong eopneun sesang (동정 없는 세상 A World Without Virginity) won the Munhakdongne Writer Award. He also wrote the short story collection Geu yeojaui chimdae (그 여자의 침대 The Woman's Bed) and the novels Anaega gyeolhonhetda (아내가 결혼했다 My Wife Got Married) and Saenuen (새는 Birds Are). Anaega received the 2nd World Literature Award.

Writing 
Park Hyun-wook’s stories typically concern romantic relationships between men and women. His debut novel Dongjeong eopneun sesang (동정 없는 세상 A World Without Virginity) is about a virgin teenager named Junho who is set on having sex with his girlfriend Seoyoung. He obsesses over losing his virginity because he doesn’t know how else to become an adult. Despite the fact that the novel opens and ends with the suggestive line “I want to do it with you,” its focus is not on sex but on growing up. The novel makes the counter-intuitive observation that growing up entails leaving the world of adults. Dongjeong has been adapted into a TV series.

Anaega gyeolhonhetda (아내가 결혼했다 My Wife Got Married) was widely discussed when it came out in 2006 due to its plot: the narrator’s wife marries another man and starts a polygamous marriage. The novel compares this relationship to a soccer match where the player’s objective is not only to score and end the game but to obtain as many chances as possible to kick the ball. Literary critic Jeong Yeoul argues that the novel portrays the poly-amorous ideal of “feeling joy at the simple fact that one is in love, irrespective of the number of lovers or their gender.” Anaega has been adapted into a film.

Works 
 그 여자의 침대 (The Woman's Bed, 2008)
 아내가 결혼했다 (My Wife Got Married, 2006)
 새는 (Birds Are, 2003)
 동정 없는 세상 (A World Without Virginity, 2001)

Works in translation 
 Comment ma femme s'est mariée (French)

Awards 
 2006: World Literature Award.
 2001: Munhakdongne Writer Award

References 

Living people
1967 births
South Korean writers